Ferdinand Friedrich Waldemar Regelsberger (September 10, 1831 – March 2, 1911) was a German jurist. Regelsberger was born in Gunzenhausen. He studied law at the University of Erlangen and at the University of Zurich. He was in 1868	
President of the University of Zurich. Regelsberger died in Göttingen.

External links 
 Nordisk familjebok
 Neue Deutsche Biographie

1831 births
1911 deaths
People from Gunzenhausen
Jurists from Bavaria